Ferenc Duschek (28 August 1797 – 17 October 1872) was a Hungarian politician of Czech origin, who served as Minister of Finance during the Hungarian Revolution of 1848. He started his career as Lajos Kossuth's state secretary. In fact Duschek managed the ministry's affairs because of the minister's occupations. After the Battle of Temesvár he was captured by the Austrian troops. After that he spent his life in full solitude.

References
 Magyar Életrajzi Lexikon

1797 births
1872 deaths
People from Kolín District
People from the Kingdom of Bohemia
Finance ministers of Hungary